This is a discography documenting albums, music, and music videos released by American go-go musician Chuck Brown.

Albums

Studio albums

Live albums

Compilation albums

Collaborative albums

Soundtrack albums

Singles

As lead artist

Music videos

References

 
 
Discographies of American artists
Rhythm and blues discographies